Tokaryovsky District is an administrative and municipal district (raion), one of the twenty-three in Tambov Oblast, Russia. It is located in the southwest of the oblast. The district borders with Znamensky District in the north, Zherdevsky District in the east, Ertilsky District of Voronezh Oblast in the south, and with Morshansky District in the west. Its administrative center is the urban locality (a work settlement) of Tokaryovka. Population: 17,898 (2010 Census);  The population of Tokaryovka accounts for 38.7% of the district's total population.

References

Notes

Sources

Districts of Tambov Oblast